Sawtell may refer to:

 E. Rosa Sawtell (1865 - 1940), New Zealand artist
 Henry Sawtell (1832–1913), mayor of Christchurch, New Zealand
 Paul Sawtell
 Sawtell, New South Wales
 Sawtell Peak in Idaho, United States

See also

 Sawtelle (disambiguation)